Farouk Yaghmour  an architect and teacher in Amman, Jordan who was inspired by historical, cultural and civilizational sites. He had many ideas for projects in Palestine, Emirates, and the United States of America.

Career
 Solomon Ponds Resort (Bethlehem)
 Emergency project (Beit Sahour)
 Baptism site (Jordan Valley)
 Spine Mosque (Dubai)
 He has brought in many investments on the part of the private sector to develop some areas such as the historic city of Hebron as well as the city of Bethlehem through lectures in the Library of Alexandria.

See also
 Amale Andraos
 Bernard Khoury

References 

Jordanian people of Circassian descent
People from Amman
Jordanian architects
Jordanian contemporary artists
Year of birth missing (living people)
Living people